Walter Skirlaw (born Swine parish, Holderness, brought up at Skirlaugh; died 1406) was an English bishop and diplomat. He was Bishop of Durham from 1388 to 1406. He was an important adviser to Richard II of England and Henry IV of England.

Life

Skirlaw was Archdeacon of the East Riding from 1359 to 1385 and Archdeacon of Northampton from 1381. In 1382, he was given custody of the privy seal, filling the office of Lord Privy Seal, which office he held until 1386. He was elected Bishop of Coventry and Lichfield on 28 June 1385, and consecrated on 14 January 1386. Then he was translated to be Bishop of Bath and Wells on 18 August 1386. On 3 April 1388, he was once again transferred, this time to the see of Durham. He would have become Archbishop of York in 1398, but Richard II over-ruled the cathedral chapter, insisting on Richard le Scrope.

Skirlaw was employed on diplomatic missions to Italy in 1381–3, to Calais to negotiate with the French in 1388, and to the Scots. He died on 24 March 1406.

Skirlaw is described as "a munificent prelate. He built bridges at Shincliffe, Bishop Auckland, and Yarm; a refuge tower, a beautiful chapter-house (now in ruins) at Howden; and was a large contributor to the expense of building the central tower of York Cathedral".

During his episcopacy much was added to Durham Cathedral, including its cloisters. He is portrayed in the east stained-glass window in York Minster, which he had made.

Notes

Citations

References
 Archdeacons of Northampton
 Bishops of Coventry and Lichfield
 Bygate, J. E. Bell's Cathedrals: The Cathedral Church of Durham, Gutenberg text
 Concise Dictionary of National Biography
 Durham Cathedral Historical Survey
 The Fading Years of the Prince Bishops
 
 Glynne Jarratt  The Life of Walter Skirlaw: Medieval Diplomat and Prince Bishop of Durham 2004
 A History of the County of East Riding: Swine Parish
 McKisack, May The Fourteenth Century
 Secrets of Hylton Castle
 Vidimus no. 6 (April 2007): Panel of the Month
 Welcome to York Minster

1406 deaths
People from Holderness
Bishops of Durham
Bishops of Bath and Wells
Bishops of Coventry and Lichfield
Archdeacons of the East Riding
Archdeacons of Northampton
14th-century English Roman Catholic bishops
15th-century English Roman Catholic bishops
Lords Privy Seal
Year of birth unknown
Clergy from Yorkshire